Sir James Allanson Picton (2 December 1805 – 15 July 1889) was an English antiquary and architect who played a large part in the public life of Liverpool.  He took a particular interest in the establishment of public libraries.

James Picton was born in Liverpool to William Picton, a joiner and timber merchant, and entered his father's business at the age of 13. He later joined the office of Daniel Stewart, an architect and surveyor, eventually taking over the business.  Picton designed some important buildings in Liverpool, including the corn exchange and Richmond Buildings, an office block, now demolished.

He became a member of the town council in 1849, and in 1851 a member (and later chairman) of the Wavertree local board. He started to campaign for a public library for the borough and in 1852 an Act of Parliament was obtained to allow the raising of a penny rate for a public library and museum.  William Brown provided the buildings for the library and museum in 1860.  In 1879 the corporation added to the library a reading room which was called the Picton Reading Room, modelled on the British Museum Reading Room.  Picton was the first chairman of the library and museum committee, which was founded in 1851, and he remained in this position until his death.

Picton married Sarah Pooley. Their son also James Allanson Picton eschewed his father's architectural practice and was eventually elected as MP for Leicester.

Architectural works

Key

Works

Notes

References

Bibliography

1805 births
1889 deaths
19th-century English architects
Politicians from Liverpool
Architects from Liverpool